Convict 99 is a British silent motion picture of 1919 produced and directed by G. B. Samuelson and starring Daisy Burrell, C. M. Hallard, Wee Georgie Wood, and Wyndham Guise. It was written by Robert Leighton and Marie Connor Leighton.

Outline
A comedy, the film consists of six reels. Ralph Vickers is a villainous convict, working against a mill owner, Mr Lucas (Wyndham Guise), who has a pretty daughter, Geraldine (Daisy Burrell), and an office boy (Wee Georgie Wood) who in the end baffles the designs of Vickers.

The film premiered at a Trade Show in April 1919.

Reception
The Era said on 9 April 1919 ”Mr. C. M. Hallard gives a finished portraiture of the villainous Ralph Vickers, Miss Daisy Burrell makes a pretty and vivacious heroine, and Wee Wood is most successful in the comedy part of James, the office boy.

The Era Dramatic & Musical Almanack commented “Convict 99 made a big hit... It features Wee Georgie Wood and Daisy Burrell. It is slightly sensational, with good comedy relief and some quite pathetic parts.”

Overseas
Convict 99 was at the Gaiety Cinema, Singapore, in February 1920, when it was advertised as - 

It was shown in Singapore again in November 1921, this time at the Empire.

Cast
 Wyndham Guise  – Mr Lucas (mill owner)
 Daisy Burrell – Geraldine Lucas (mill owner's daughter)
 Wee Georgie Wood – James (office boy)
 Tom Coventry  – Hewett (time-keeper)
 Ernest A. Graham – Lawrence Gray (manager)
 C. M. Hallard – Ralph Vickers (assistant manager) 
 Arnold Bell – Warder Gannaway

Notes

External links
Convict 99 at BFI Film & TV database

1919 films
1910s English-language films
Films set in England
British silent feature films
British black-and-white films